Washoe County may refer to:

Places 
 Washoe County, Nevada

Ships 
 USS LST-1165, a United States Navy landing ship tank commissioned in 1953 and renamed USS Washoe County (LST-1165) in 1955
 USS Washoe County (LST-1165), a United States Navy landing ship tank in commission from 1953 to 1971.
 USNS Washoe County (T-LST-1165), a United States Navy landing ship tank in non-commissioned service in the Military Sealift Command as a cargo ship in 1973 which had previously been in commission as USS Washoe County (LST-1165).